Stenocercus roseiventris, the rose whorltail iguana, is a species of lizard of the Tropiduridae family. It is found in Bolivia, Peru, Argentina, and Brazil.

References

Stenocercus
Reptiles described in 1837
Reptiles of Bolivia
Reptiles of Peru
Reptiles of Argentina
Reptiles of Brazil
Taxa named by Alcide d'Orbigny